Yeasin Ali (born 1 July 1961) is a Bangladeshi politician. He has served as a member of the Jatiyo Sangshad since 2014, representing Thakurgaon-3 for the Workers Party of Bangladesh.

Background
Ali is a university professor

References

Living people
1961 births
Workers Party of Bangladesh politicians
10th Jatiya Sangsad members
Bangladeshi communists
Place of birth missing (living people)